Mikkel Michael Frankoch (born 14 January 1996) is a Danish footballer.

Career

Early career
Frankoch started playing football in Greve IF at the age of 5 with his dad as his coach. As U14 player, Frankoch got a few invites from other clubs, but chose Brøndby IF because it was his supporter team. In Brøndby, Frankoch was retrained from being a defender to a midfielder. A year after his arrival, he went on three trial camps at FC Midtjylland and the club ended up offering him a youth contract. He decided to wait and joined the club a year later. He stayed at Midtjylland for the rest of his youth years.

Senior career
In the summer 2015, Frankoch signed with his first senior club, Skive IK in the Danish 1st Division. He played for the club two years, before joining fellow club Vendsyssel FF.

On 1 February 2020 it was confirmed, that Frankoch's former manager in both Skive IK and Vendsyssel FF, Jens Berthel Askou, had brought him to HB Tórshavn where he had been appointed manager in December 2019. He left the club at the end of 2020.

After a spell at Norwegian club Raufoss IL in 2021, Frankoch returned to Skive IK on 31 August 2021.

References

External links
Mikkel Frankoch at DBU

1996 births
Living people
Danish men's footballers
Danish expatriate men's footballers
Association football midfielders
Denmark youth international footballers
Skive IK players
Vendsyssel FF players
Greve Fodbold players
Brøndby IF players
FC Midtjylland players
Havnar Bóltfelag players
Danish Superliga players
Danish 1st Division players
Faroe Islands Premier League players
Expatriate footballers in the Faroe Islands
Expatriate footballers in Norway
Danish expatriate sportspeople in Norway